Loris Reggiani (born 7 October 1959 in Forlì) is an Italian former Grand Prix motorcycle road racer who competed for the Aprilia factory racing team. His best years were in 1981, when he won two races in the 125 class, finishing the season in second place behind Angel Nieto, and in 1992 in the 250 class, when he again won two races and finishing in second place again, this time to Luca Cadalora. Reggiani was the first rider to win a Grand Prix for the Aprilia factory when he won the 1987 San Marino Grand Prix. In 1994, Reggiani moved up to the 500cc class aboard a new bike from Aprilia with a V-twin, 250cc engine that had been enlarged to 380cc in hopes of taking advantage of the bike's lightweight and agility against their more powerful competition. In spite of development problems, Reggiani managed a 10th place in the 1995 season. He retired from competition after the 1995 season. He won a total of 8 Grands Prix during his career.

Motorcycle Grand Prix Results
Points system from 1969 to 1987:

Points system from 1988 to 1992:

Points system from 1993

(key) (Races in bold indicate pole position; races in italics indicate fastest lap)

References 

1959 births
Living people
People from Forlì
Italian motorcycle racers
125cc World Championship riders
250cc World Championship riders
350cc World Championship riders
500cc World Championship riders
Sportspeople from the Province of Forlì-Cesena